Sahand, is a massive, heavily eroded stratovolcano in East Azerbaijan Province, northwestern Iran. At , it is the highest mountain in the  province of East Azarbaijan.

Sahand is one of the highest mountains in Iranian Azerbaijan, in addition to being an important dormant volcano in the country. Due to the presence of a variety of flora and fauna, the Sahand mountains are known as the bride of mountains in Iran.

The absolute dating of Sahand rocks indicates that this volcano has been sporadically active from 12 million years ago up to almost 0.14 million years ago. Sahand is made chiefly of dacite and associated felsic rocks.

Winter sports 
Sahand Ski Resort is on the northern foothills of the mountain and near the city of Tabriz. In the complex the Sahand Skiing Stadium has a 1200 meters length ski area and skiing and snowboarding is practiced in the resort. The snow sculpture competition, which runs once a year at mid-winter in the stadium, is a famous entertainment that attracts spectators and competitors from all over the country.

See also
 List of volcanoes in Iran
 Sahand University of Technology
 List of Ultras of West Asia
 Kandovan rock dwellings

References

 

Stratovolcanoes of Iran
Mountains of Iran
Mountaineering in Iran
Landforms of East Azerbaijan Province
Mounts of East Azerbaijan Province
Miocene stratovolcanoes
Pliocene stratovolcanoes
Pleistocene stratovolcanoes